Briercrest is a village in the Canadian province of Saskatchewan within the Rural Municipality of Redburn No. 130 and Census Division No. 6. The village is approximately 42 km southeast of the City of Moose Jaw and 77 km southwest of the City of Regina. When the post office formed in 1903, it was a part of the Federal Electoral District: Assiniboia, North West Territories, as well as part of the provisional district of Assiniboia West, North West Territories, until the province of Saskatchewan was formed in 1905.

History 
Briercrest incorporated as a village on April 17, 1912.

Demographics 

Education 

Coventry School Division (SD) 213, North West Territories (NWT) was one of the first one-room schools started in 1891. Hipperholme SD 467, NWT soon followed in 1899. Many more one-room school districts developed in the early 1900s to survive until the mid-20th century when they were gradually replaced with the Briercrest Family of Schools.

Briercrest College and Seminary
The Briercrest College and Seminary was originally founded as the Briercrest Bible Institute in Briercrest in 1935, which has since moved to Caronport. In 1946, a larger facility was needed for the increasing number of students, and the airbase at Caronport became the school's new home. The school, however, continued to honour its early history by retaining the name of Briercrest as its birthplace.

References

Further reading 
"Wheat Fields and Wild Roses Briercrest and Districts." Briercrest & District Historical Society Box 14, Briercrest Sask 1988. Village of Briercrest and area.  Blue Hill Cemetery, Briercrest Cemetery and Briercrest Lutheran Cemetery.

External links 

Villages in Saskatchewan
Redburn No. 130, Saskatchewan
Division No. 6, Saskatchewan